David Rupert (born July 27, 1951) is an American former FBI/British intelligence agent whose testimony led to the arrest and prosecution of Michael McKevitt, the reputed leader of the Real IRA, for the Omagh Bombing.

Background
David Rupert was awarded the FBI's Lou Peters Award in 2013.

Testimony
Rupert's testimony was crucial in McKevitt being convicted of directing terrorism. In 2006, McKevitt's legal team appealed the conviction based on the defense team not having access to information concerning the tax affairs of Rupert during the original trial. All appeals were denied.

References

1951 births
Living people
People from St. Lawrence County, New York
Double agents